Railway Colony Municipal Higher Secondary School is a co-educational secondary school in Erode of Tamil Nadu, India. The school is managed by the Municipality of Erode.

It's located in Kollampalayam, Erode

References

Railway schools in India
High schools and secondary schools in Tamil Nadu
Schools in Erode district
Education in Erode